The tenth season of Impractical Jokers premiered on February 9, 2023. It is also the first season to be simulcast on truTV and TBS.

Episodes

References

External links 
 Impractical Jokers official website at TruTV
 

Impractical Jokers
2023 American television seasons